Netherlands Antilles participated in the 2010 Summer Youth Olympics in Singapore.

The Netherlands Antilles team consisted of 5 athletes competing in 3 sports: athletics, sailing and swimming.

Medalists

Athletics

Boys
Track and road events

Girls
Track and road events

Sailing

One Person Dinghy

Swimming

References

External links
Competitors List: Netherlands Antilles

Nations at the 2010 Summer Youth Olympics
Youth
Netherlands Antilles at the Youth Olympics